"I'm Ready" is a song by Canadian rock musician Bryan Adams. It was written by Adams and collaborator Jim Vallance. The song was first released in 1979, by Ian Lloyd (formerly of The Stories), on his solo album Goose Bumps. Vallance played the drums on this recording. In 1983 Adams himself recorded the song for his third album, Cuts Like a Knife, as a straightforward rock song with electric guitar and synthesizer. Adams co-produced his version with Bob Clearmountain, who also mixed it.

The song became a hit for Adams in 1998, after its inclusion on his 1997 album Unplugged. Patrick Leonard was producing these sessions, and selected "I'm Ready" to be included in the show. For this concert, the song was re-arranged as an acoustic ballad with string orchestrations added by Michael Kamen, who had previously worked on some of Adams' biggest hits, and played by students of the Juilliard School. It also features a low whistle played by Davy Spillane. In 1998 the song was released as the second single from Unplugged, after "Back to You". This version is also included on the two best-of-compilations The Best of Me and Anthology.

Italian release
In 2001, "I'm Ready" was re-released in Italy with new lyrics, now entitled "Io Vivo (In Te)". The new Italian lyrics were written by Zucchero Fornaciari. Zucchero also produced the new version, basically using the Unplugged recording, and recording new vocals on top of it (notice the audience and some of Bryan's original vocals still audible on the track). Also featured is additional percussion, added by Martyn Philips using Pro Tools. Philips, along with Randy Staub engineered "Io Vivo (In Te)"; the latter also mixing the track (originally mixed by Bob Clearmountain). The single uses the same picture and colour scheme as the original release of "I'm Ready", only using a different font.

Music video
The music video was directed by Nigel Dick, although footage of the original performance was also shown on MTV, prior to the single being released.

Charts

Weekly charts

Year-end charts

References

Bryan Adams songs
1979 songs
1998 singles
Songs written by Jim Vallance
Songs written by Bryan Adams
Song recordings produced by Bob Clearmountain